Frank Mills (born 1942) is a Canadian pianist.

Frank Mills may also refer to:

Frank R. Mills (1870–1921), American stage and silent film actor
Frank Mills (baseball) (1895–1983), American baseball catcher
Frank Mills (British actor) (1927–2021), British actor
Sir Frank Mills (diplomat) (1923–2006), British diplomat
Frank Mills (physician) (1910–2008), Australian heart surgeon
Frank Mills (politician) (1904–1969), member of the Ohio House of Representatives
Frank Mills (rugby union) (1873–1925), Wales national rugby union player
"Frank Mills", a song from the musical Hair